Eucalyptus behriana, commonly known as bull mallee and broad-leaved box,  is a species of mallee or small tree that is endemic to south-eastern Australia. It has rough, fibrous bark on the lower part of the trunk and smooth bark above, broadly lance-shaped adult leaves, flower buds in groups of seven, white flowers and cup-shaped or barrel-shaped fruit.

Description
It has rough, fibrous, dark brown to black bark on the base of the trunk and smooth greyish, greenish or coppery bark on the upper trunk and branches.

Flowering mainly occurs from September to February and the flowers are white.

Taxonomy and naming
Eucalyptus behriana was first formally described by Victorian Government Botanist Ferdinand von Mueller in 1855 and the description was published in  Transactions and Proceedings of the Victorian Institute for the Advancement of Science. The specific epithet (behriana) honours Hans Hermann Behr.

Distribution
Eucalyptus behriana has a disjunct distribution in south-eastern Australia. In New South Wales it occurs in mallee shrubland near West Wyalong. In Victoria it occurs in the Mallee and Wimmera in the north-west, with the exception of a small outlying  population in the south near Bacchus Marsh including Long Forest Nature Conservation Reserve. In South Australia, it has a scattered distribution across the south-east.

See also

List of Eucalyptus species

References

Flora of New South Wales
Flora of South Australia
Flora of Victoria (Australia)
Trees of Australia
behriana
Myrtales of Australia
Mallees (habit)
Plants described in 1855
Taxa named by Ferdinand von Mueller